Drvenik is a village in southern Dalmatia, Croatia, in Gradac municipality, located between Makarska and Ploče. Drvenik lies in two bays (Gornja vala and Donja vala) surrounded by the mountain range Biokovo.

Drvenik has a ferry port with multiple arrivals and departures per day.

Industries
The main industry is tourism. Other industries include fishing and agriculture, especially goats and olives.

See also 
Croatia
Makarska
Gradac

References 

https://www.croatia-expert.com/drvenik/

Populated places in Split-Dalmatia County
Populated coastal places in Croatia